Belvoir Terrace is a performing arts summer camp for girls near Lenox, Massachusetts, US. The camp is used by girls to expand their abilities in theatre, art, music, and dance.

History
Edna Y. Schwartz created a performing arts summer program for women at Belvoir Terrace in 1954. Her daughter, Nancy Goldberg, and granddaughter, Diane Goldberg Marcus, are the current directors/owners.

Belvoir Terrace was built by Rotch & Tilden between 1888 and 1890 for Morris K. Jesup. Its landscape was designed by Frederick Law Olmsted. In the early 1920s, John Shepherd purchased and renovated the property as a summer retreat.

Notable alumnae
Terra Naomi (an alternative rock/pop musician)
Jennifer Elise Cox Actress

References
Notes

Sources

External links 
 Official website
 Photos of Lenox, Massachusetts

Summer camps in Massachusetts
1954 establishments in Massachusetts
Buildings and structures in Berkshire County, Massachusetts